Karel Jalovec (born 1892, Austro-Hungarian Empire) was a Czechoslovak musicologist who compiled three reference books on violins and violin makers and a two volume encyclopedia on violin makers.

Published works 
 Czechoslovak writer Karel Jalovec (born 1892) published compilations and a two-volume general encyclopedia

See also 
 :Category:Lutherie reference books

References 

Czechoslovak musicologists
Czechoslovak male writers
1892 births
Year of death missing